Martin Aigner (born February 28, 1942 in Linz) is an Austrian mathematician and professor at Freie Universität Berlin since 1974 with interests in combinatorial mathematics and graph theory.

He received his Ph.D from the University of Vienna. His book Proofs from THE BOOK (co-written with Günter M. Ziegler) has been translated into 12 languages.

He is a recipient of a 1996 Lester R. Ford Award from the Mathematical Association of America for his expository article Turán's Graph Theorem. In 2018, Aigner received the Leroy P. Steele Prize for Mathematical Exposition (jointly with Günter M. Ziegler).

Bibliography
	
Combinatorial Theory (1997 reprint: ,)
(with Günter M. Ziegler) Proofs from THE BOOK

A Course in Enumeration, 2007, 

Mathematics Everywhere. Martin Aigner (Author, Editor), Ehrhard Behrends (Editor), 2010
Alles Mathematik: Von Pythagoras zum CD-player,  by Martin Aigner, Ehrhard Behrends, 2008, 
Combinatorial search. Teubner, Stuttgart 1988, 
Graphentheorie. Eine Entwicklung aus dem 4-Farben-Problem. Teubner, Stuttgart 1984, 
Diskrete Mathematik. Mit über 500 Übungsaufgaben. 
Vieweg, Braunschweig/Wiesbaden 1993, 
corrected edition 12006,

References

1942 births
Living people
Scientists from Linz
Austrian Roman Catholics
Austrian mathematicians
Academic staff of the Free University of Berlin
Cartellverband members
University of Vienna alumni
Members of the Austrian Academy of Sciences